The following is the list of ASEAN countries by the Human Development Index as well as when it's adjusted by inequality. As of the latest report, Singapore has the highest HDI in ASEAN and Asia in general at 0.938, and Myanmar has the lowest HDI in ASEAN at 0.583. The inequality-adjusted report also has Singapore at the top with 0.823, and Myanmar having the lowest with 0.445.

Standard HDI

List

Map
This map shows the countries by its Human Development Index, The color indicators are as follows:         
 Very High Human Development  High Human Development  Medium Human Development

Inequality-adjusted HDI

List

Map
This map shows the countries by its inequality-adjusted Human Development Index, The color indicators are as follows:         
 Very High Human Development  Medium Human Development  Low Human Development

See also
List of ASEAN country subdivisions by GDP
List of ASEAN countries by GDP

References

Human Development Index
ASEAN